The Rapid River is a  river on the Upper Peninsula of the U.S. state of Michigan. It rises in Bergland Township and flows mostly east into the Big Iron River.

See also
List of rivers of Michigan

References 

Rivers of Michigan
Rivers of Ontonagon County, Michigan
Tributaries of Lake Superior